Julian Koster (born July 26, 1972) is an American multidisciplinary artist. As a musician he is a member of the Elephant 6 Collective, the leader of The Music Tapes, and a member of Neutral Milk Hotel. He is known for writing, directing, and acting in audio fiction The Orbiting Human Circus (of the Air), and for performing with the theatrical troupe of the same name. He is also known for his heavy use of the musical saw in recordings, even releasing The Singing Saw at Christmastime, his only solo album released under his own name, in 2008.

Early career: Chocolate USA

In 1989, Koster formed Miss America with Liza Wakeman, Alan Edwards, Paul Wells and Keith Block. After legal threats from Miss America, they became Chocolate USA. Chocolate USA released two albums on Bar/None before disbanding to follow other projects.

Neutral Milk Hotel

Koster joined Jeff Mangum, Scott Spillane and Jeremy Barnes to record the second Neutral Milk Hotel album, In the Aeroplane over the Sea, on which he played banjo and singing saw. Koster also played bass guitar in the live band. The success of the album, however, took its toll on Mangum, and the band went on hiatus shortly after its release. They reunited in 2013 for a worldwide tour.

The Music Tapes and other projects
After Neutral Milk Hotel, Koster began to concentrate on his own solo project, The Music Tapes, for which he contributed banjo, singing saw, chord organ, and vocals, among other instruments. 1st Imaginary Symphony For Nomad was released in 1999. Koster, together with Brian Dewan, recorded the story album The 2nd Imaginary Symphony for Cloudmaking, which was distributed by Koster on CD but never officially released for 15 years. After this, nothing was released by The Music Tapes until 2008, when Music Tapes for Clouds and Tornadoes arrived, followed by extensive touring (including the Elephant 6 Holiday Surprise Tour) and an unprecedented level of public appearance by the formerly reclusive Koster.

Koster was a founding member of Major Organ and the Adding Machine. He appeared in the Major Organ and the Adding Machine film which was shown on the Holiday Surprise tour and was later released with an expanded edition of the 2001 album in 2009.

In 2008, Koster released The Singing Saw at Christmastime, a collection of Christmas carols played on the singing saw. This was followed by a caroling tour, on which he played songs from The Singing Saw at Christmastime and selected tracks from Music Tapes for Clouds and Tornadoes for free wherever fans invited him to play.  This evolved into an annual caroling tradition, which transformed into the "Lullabies at Bedsides" house tour of 2010–2011 and 2011–2012 which in turn gave way to the long-planned Traveling Imaginary of 2012–2013.  After the EP Purim's Shadows in 2011, in 2012, The Music Tapes released their third full-length LP, Mary's Voice.

On October 12, 2016, The Orbiting Human Circus (of the Air) podcast was released, with Koster starring as Julian the Janitor.

Koster voiced Slime Boy in the animated series High Guardian Spice.

Personal life
Koster's father is noted flamenco guitarist Dennis Koster.

Koster does not identify as straight.

Koster is close friends with Hedwig and the Angry Inch co-creator John Cameron Mitchell, having contributed to early readings of the production and featured the character of Hedwig in some early tours with The Music Tapes. Mitchell is a cast member on Koster's Orbiting Human Circus podcast.

Discography 
As Julian Koster
The Singing Saw at Christmastime (Merge; CD/LP/FLAC; 2008)

With Chocolate USA
 All Jets Are Gonna Fall Today (Bar/None; Cassette/CD; 1992) (Originally released as Miss America. Re-released as Chocolate USA.)
 Smoke Machine (Bar/None; CD; 1994)

With Major Organ and the Adding Machine
Christmas in Stereo (Kindercore; CD; 1997)
Major Organ and the Adding Machine (Orange Twin; CD; 2001)

With The Music Tapes
 Please Hear Mr. Flight Control (Elephant Six; 7"; 1997)
 The Television Tells Us (Elephant Six; 7"; 1998)
 1st Imaginary Symphony For Nomad (Merge; CD/LP; 1999)
 The Music Tapes and Dad (Given free with 'Stop Smiling Magazine' #8; 7"; 2000)
 2nd Imaginary Symphony For Cloudmaking (Self-released; CD; 2002)
 Music Tapes for Clouds and Tornadoes (Merge; CD/LP; 2008)
 Purim's Shadows: The Dark Tours the World (Merge; MP3/kazoo; 2011)
 Mary's Voice (Merge; CD/LP; 2012)
 The Orbiting Human Circus (Merge; MP3; 2017)
 The Sea of Tranquility (Merge; MP3/FLAC; 2019)

With Neutral Milk Hotel
 In the Aeroplane Over the Sea (Merge; CD; 1998)
 Ferris Wheel on Fire (Neutral Milk Hotel Records; 10" EP; 2011)

Other Appearances

References

External links
 The Music Tapes – "All Official Announcements"
 An interview with Julian Koster: Some other lovely reality intruding into ours August 31, 2012 via Talk Rock To Me

Sources
Cooper, Kim "Neutral Milk Hotel's in the Aeroplane Over the Sea (33)", 2005

Living people
American banjoists
American accordionists
American mandolinists
American rock guitarists
American male guitarists
The Elephant 6 Recording Company artists
1972 births
21st-century accordionists
21st-century American guitarists
21st-century American male musicians
Neutral Milk Hotel members
Major Organ and the Adding Machine members
American LGBT musicians
LGBT men